Memories is 2023 Indian Tamil-language action thriller film written and directed by Syam and Praveen, and produced by Shijuthameens under, Shijuthameen's Film Factory PVT LTD. It features Vetri, Parvathy Arun, Dayyana, and Ramesh Thilak in the lead roles with R. N. R. Manohar, Hareesh Peradi, Sajil, Srikumar, Salildas playing the pivotal roles.

Cast

Production 
The film's shoot began in 2019 and got wrapped in September 2020.

Marketing
The film's title announcement was released by vishal actor on 24 February 2020.

The Film posters was designed by Adhin Ollur

Soundtrack 
The soundtrack and score is composed by Gavaskar Avinash and the album featured one song. The audio rights were acquired by Lahari Music.

Reception 
The film was released theatrically worldwide on 10 March 2023. The film received negative reviews from critics. Logesh Balachandran critic from Times of India gave 1.5 stars out of 5 stars and noted that " Memories, an experience we wish to erase from our memory ". A critic from Thesouthfirst said, "In all, Memories really tests your memory and make you sweat to make a sense of it." Cinema Express felt "film ends up being a largely forgettable experience despite having a fantastical premise at the core of it all".

However, A critic from Maalai Malar gave a positive review citing " Director Sam and Praveen has directed the film with the same concept of memory erasing and memory inserting. Kudos to him for his new venture." and gave 2.75 stars out of 5 stars. A critic from Dina Thanthi noted that " Directors Shyam and Praveen make the psycho-thriller story with a lively screenplay without boring the idea of ​​erasing one's memory and replacing it with another."

References

External links 

 

Indian action thriller films
2020s Tamil-language films
Indian psychological thriller films